Green Bay Country Club (GBCC) is a country club located in Bellevue, Wisconsin.  The club was established in 1995 and has two sections: a sports center and a golf course.

Sports center 
The sports center contains a swimming pool with a waterslide, beach volleyball, a cabana, six tennis courts, a nine-hole putting course, a practice putting and chipping green, and a six-hole par three golf course, also called the Quarry Course.

Golf course

Tournaments
Green Bay Country Club was the home of the Great Lakes Classic, an event played during the first three years of the Women's Senior Golf Tour (now the Legends Tour).  In 2000, the initial year of the tour, the tournament was sponsored by ShopKo and won by Vicki Fergon. In 2001 it was again sponsored by ShopKo, and won by Hollis Stacy.  In 2002 the tournament was renamed the Copps Great Lakes Classic, and the winner was Patty Sheehan.

The course has also been the venue for the Wisconsin State Golf Association Match Play Championship.

Golf Digest has listed the course as one of the top 10 courses in Wisconsin.

Layout
The golf course has eighteen holes and has a total of eight teeing options.

Scorecard

References

External links
Official site

Buildings and structures in Brown County, Wisconsin
Green Bay metropolitan area
Golf clubs and courses in Wisconsin
Sports venues completed in 1995
1995 establishments in Wisconsin